Euphorbia melitensis is a species of plant in the family Euphorbiaceae. It is endemic to Malta.

References

melitensis
Endemic flora of Malta
Taxa named by Filippo Parlatore
Plants described in 1869
Flora of Malta